Kurt Kuhnke (30 April 1910, Stettin – 8 February 1969, Braunschweig) was a racing driver from Germany, although he was more successful in motorcycle racing.

After racing motorcycles during the late 1940s Kurt moved into car racing with a Formula Three Cooper 500 which he raced regularly 1950s with a number of wins and good finishes. He also competed in a few Formula Junior and Formula Two races before he finally moved into Formula One, failing to qualify Wolfgang Seidel's Lotus 18 at the non-Championship 1962 Pau Grand Prix before retiring the same car from the Solitude Grand Prix that year with engine failure. The first appearance of his Borgward-engined Lotus was delayed through problems preparing the engine, and Kuhnke missed four races he had entered in the second half of 1962. This engine was an old Sports Car unit, equipped with twin cams and direct fuel injection.

In 1963, Kuhnke failed to qualify his BKL Lotus at the Rome Grand Prix, along with team-mate Ernst Maring, and both cars suffered engine failures at the Solitude Grand Prix in July. His single World Championship Formula One entry was at the 1963 German Grand Prix where he failed to qualify by a considerable margin. The BKL Lotus was simply an ordinary Lotus, lightly modified by Kuhnke, the initials standing for Borgward Kuhnke Lotus.

After this, he retired from the Kanonloppet at the Karlskoga Circuit in Sweden with fuel injection problems, before moving away from Formula One as a driver. He subsequently entered two BKL Lotus cars in the 1964 Solitude Grand Prix for Maring and German helicopter pilot Joachim Diel. Diel's car was one of seven eliminated in wet-weather accidents on the first lap, but Maring managed to finish 10th and last, four laps down on the leader – the only occasion on which one of Kuhnke's cars finished a Formula One race.

Complete Formula One World Championship results
(key)

Non-Championship

(key)

References

 "The Grand Prix Who's Who", Steve Small, 1995.
 "The Formula One Record Book", John Thompson, 1974.
 Kurt Kuhnke profile at The 500 Owners Association

1910 births
1969 deaths
Sportspeople from Szczecin
People from the Province of Pomerania
German racing drivers
German Formula One drivers